Indirect presidential elections were held in Colombia on 3 August 1909. The result was a victory for Ramón González Valencia.

Background
President Rafael Reyes went into exile on 13 June 1909. Jorge Holguín served as temporary president until a new Congress was elected in June was able to elect an interim president to serve out the remainder of Reyes' term, which ended on 7 August 1910.

Results

References

Colombia
Presidential elections in Colombia
1909 in Colombia
August 1909 events